Ernest Dimnet (1866-1954), French priest, writer and lecturer, is the author of The Art of Thinking, a popular book on thinking and reasoning during the 1930s.

Biography
Dimnet was born in France. He served as canon at the Cambrai Cathedral and was a professor at the Stanislas College in Paris. He started writing in for English magazines in 1898. He moved to the United States after the First World War and worked as a lecturer at Harvard University and the Williamstown Institute of Politics.

His most notable book was The Art of Thinking was on the best-seller lists in the US in the 1930s, alongside Dale Carnegie's self-help works, but it is mostly forgotten today. The book invites the reader into a state of honesty where he evaluates himself as a thoughtful human being. Dimnet brings up the fact that we too often only "think of thinking" about something instead of actually thinking. He provides useful tips and advice on how to improve one's concentration, and even endeavors to answer some timeless and all-important questions such as "How do I find myself?" Finding answers to these questions, Dimnet explains, is crucial to the production of any original thought. We must know ourselves in order to think for ourselves.

Works 
In French
 La Pensée catholique dans l'Angleterre contemporaine, V. Lecoffre, (1906)
 Figures de moines, Perrin, (1909)
 Les soeurs Brontë, Bloud, (1910)
 L'Art de penser, Grasset, (1930)

In English
 Paul Bourget: A Literary Biography, (1913)
 France Herself Again, (1914)
 The Evolution of Thought in Modern France, (1915)
 From a Paris Balcony, (1924)
 The Art of Thinking, (1929)
 What We Live By, (1932)
 My Old World, (1935)
 My New World, (1938)

Source:

References

External links

 
 
 Quotes from Ernest Dimnet.

1866 births
1954 deaths
20th-century French male writers
French male writers